Waśki may refer to the following places:
Waśki, Hajnówka County in Podlaskie Voivodeship (north-east Poland)
Waśki, Kolno County in Podlaskie Voivodeship (north-east Poland)
Waśki, Mońki County in Podlaskie Voivodeship (north-east Poland)